A Connecticut Yankee in King Arthur's Court is an 1889 novel by American humorist and writer Mark Twain. The book was originally titled A Yankee in King Arthur's Court. Some early editions are titled A Yankee at the Court of King Arthur.

In the book, a Yankee engineer from Connecticut named Hank Morgan receives a severe blow to the head and is somehow transported in time and space to England during the reign of King Arthur. After some initial confusion and his capture by one of Arthur's knights, Hank realizes that he is actually in the past, and he uses his knowledge to make people believe that he is a powerful magician. He becomes a rival of Merlin, who appears to be little more than a fraud, and gains the trust of King Arthur. Hank attempts to modernize the past in order to make people's lives better. Hank is disgusted by how the Barons treat the commoners, and tries to implement democratic reforms, but in the end he is unable to prevent the death of Arthur. Hank declares England a republic, but the Catholic Church - growing fearful of his power - issues an interdict against him.

Twain wrote the book as a burlesque of Romantic notions of chivalry after being inspired by a dream in which he was a knight himself, severely inconvenienced by the weight and cumbersome nature of his armor.  It is a satire of feudalism and monarchy that also celebrates homespun ingenuity and democratic values while questioning the for-profit ideals of capitalism and outcomes of the Industrial Revolution. At one point in the book, Twain even defends the French Revolution. It is among several works by Twain and his contemporaries that mark the transition from the Gilded Age to the Progressive Era of socioeconomic discourse. It is often cited as a formative example of the fledgling time travel genre.

Plot

The novel is a comedy set in 6th-century England and its medieval culture through Hank Morgan's view; he is a 19th-century resident of East Hartford, Connecticut, who, after a blow to the head, awakens to find himself inexplicably transported back in time to early medieval England, where he meets King Arthur himself. Hank, who had an image of that time that had been colored over the years by romantic myths, takes on the task of analyzing the problems and sharing his knowledge from 1300 years in the future to try to modernize, Americanize, and improve the lives of the people.

Many passages are quoted directly from Sir Thomas Malory's Le Morte d'Arthur, a late medieval collection of Arthurian legends that constitutes one of the main sources on the myth of King Arthur and Camelot. The frame narrator is a 19th-century man (ostensibly Mark Twain himself) who meets Hank Morgan in modern times and begins reading Hank's book in the museum in which they both meet. Later, characters in the story retell parts of it in Malory's original language. A chapter on medieval hermits also draws from the work of William Edward Hartpole Lecky.

Introduction to the "stranger"

The story begins as a first-person narrative in Warwick Castle, where a man details his recollection of a tale told to him by an "interested stranger" who is personified as a knight through his simple language and familiarity with ancient armor.

After a brief tale of Sir Lancelot of Camelot and his role in slaying two giants from the third-person narrative, taken directly from Le Morte d'Arthur, the man named Hank Morgan enters and, after being given whiskey by the narrator, he is persuaded to reveal more of his story. Described through first-person narrative as a man familiar with the firearms and machinery trade, Hank is a man who had reached the level of superintendent because of his proficiency in firearms manufacturing, with 2000 subordinates. He describes the beginning of his tale by illustrating details of a disagreement with his subordinates during which he sustained a head injury from a "crusher" caused by a man named "Hercules" using a crowbar.

After passing out from the blow, Hank describes waking up underneath an oak tree, having no idea how he got there. Hank soon encounters the knight Sir Kay, riding by. Kay challenges him to a joust, which is quickly lost by the unweaponed, unarmored Hank as he scuttles up a tree. Kay captures Hank and leads him towards Camelot Castle. Upon recognizing that he has time-traveled to the 6th century, Hank realizes that he is the de facto smartest person on Earth, and with his knowledge he should soon be running things.

Hank is ridiculed at King Arthur's court for his strange appearance and dress and is sentenced by them, particularly the magician Merlin, to burn at the stake on 21 June. By a stroke of luck, the date of the burning coincides with a historical solar eclipse in 528 of which Hank had learned in his earlier life. In prison, he sends the boy whom he christens Clarence (whose real name is Amyas le Poulet) to inform the king that he will blot out the sun if he is executed. Hank believes the current date to be 20 June; however, it is actually the 21st when he makes his threat, the day that the eclipse will occur at 12:03 p.m. When the King decides to burn him, the eclipse catches Hank by surprise. However, he quickly uses it to his advantage and convinces the people that he caused the eclipse. He makes a bargain with the king, is released, and becomes the second most powerful person in the kingdom. (Twain may have drawn inspiration for that part of the story from a historical incident in which Christopher Columbus exploited foreknowledge of a lunar eclipse.)

Hank is given the position of principal minister to the king and is treated by all with the utmost fear and awe. His celebrity brings him to be known by a new title, elected by the people, "The Boss". However, he proclaims that his only income will be taken as a percentage of any increase in the kingdom's gross national product, which he succeeds in creating for the state as Arthur's chief minister, which King Arthur sees as fair. Although the people fear him and he has his new title, Hank is still seen as somewhat of an equal. The people might grovel to him if he were a knight or some form of nobility, but Hank faces problems from time to time since he refuses to seek to join such ranks.

The Takeover 
After being made "the Boss," Hank learns about medieval practices and superstitions. Having superior knowledge, he is able to outdo the alleged sorcerers and miracle-working church officials. At one point, soon after the eclipse, people began gathering, hoping to see Hank perform another miracle. Merlin, jealous of Hank having replaced him both as the king's principal adviser and as the most powerful sorcerer of the realm, begins spreading rumors that Hank is a fake and cannot supply another miracle. Hank secretly manufactures gunpowder and a lightning rod, plants explosive charges in Merlin's tower, and places the lightning rod at the top and runs a wire to the explosive charges. He then announces (when storms are frequent) that he will soon call down fire from heaven and destroy Merlin's tower, challenging Merlin to use his sorcery to prevent it. Of course, Merlin's "incantations" fail utterly to prevent lightning from striking the rod, triggering the explosive charges, and leveling the tower, further diminishing Merlin's reputation.

Hank Morgan, in his position as King's Minister, uses his authority and his modern knowledge to industrialize the country behind the back of the rest of the ruling class. His assistant is Clarence, a young boy he meets at court, whom he educates and gradually lets in on most of his secrets, and eventually comes to rely on heavily. Hank sets up secret schools, which teach modern ideas and modern English, thereby removing the new generation from medieval concepts and secretly constructs hidden factories, which produce modern tools and weapons. He carefully selects the individuals he allows to enter his factories and schools, seeking to select only the most promising and least indoctrinated in medieval ideas, favoring selection of the young and malleable whenever possible.

As Hank gradually adjusts to his new situation, he begins to attend medieval tournaments. A misunderstanding causes Sir Sagramore to challenge Hank to a duel to the death. The combat will take place when Sagramore returns from his quest for the Holy Grail. Hank accepts and spends the next few years building up 19th-century infrastructure behind the nobility's back. He then undertakes an adventure with a wandering girl named the Demoiselle Alisande a la Carteloise, nicknamed "Sandy" by Hank in short order, to save her royal "mistresses" being held captive by ogres. On the way, Hank struggles with the inconveniences of plate armor (actually an anachronism, which would not be developed until the High Middle Ages or see widespread use until the Late Middle Ages) and encounters Morgan le Fay. The "princesses", "ogres", and "castles" are all revealed to be actually pigs owned by peasant swineherds, but to Sandy, they still appear as royalty. Hank buys the pigs from the peasants, and the two leave.

On the way back to Camelot, they find a travelling group of pilgrims headed for the Valley of Holiness. Another group of pilgrims, however, comes from that direction and bears the news that the valley's famous fountain has run dry. According to legend, long ago the fountain had gone dry as soon as the monks of the valley's monastery built a bath with it. The bath was destroyed and the water instantly returned, but this time it has stopped with no clear cause. Hank is begged to restore the fountain although Merlin is already trying to do so. When Merlin fails, he claims that the fountain has been corrupted by a demon and that it will never flow again. Hank, to look good, agrees that a demon has corrupted the fountain but also claims to be able to banish it; in reality, the "fountain" is simply leaking.

He procures assistants from Camelot trained by himself, who bring along a pump and fireworks for special effects. They repair the fountain and Hank begins the "banishment" of the demon. At the end of several long pseudo-Germanic "magical" phrases cued to his firework displays, he spouts a nonsense noise, "BGWJJILLIGKKK", but Merlin agrees with Hank that it is the name of the demon. The fountain restored, Hank goes on to debunk another magician who claims to be able to tell what any person in the world is doing, including King Arthur. However, Hank knows via telephone that the King is riding out to see the restored fountain and not "resting from the chase" as the "false prophet" had foretold to the people. Hank correctly states that the King will arrive in the valley.

Hank has an idea to travel among the poor disguised as a peasant to find out how they truly live. King Arthur joins him but has extreme difficulty in acting like a peasant convincingly. Although Arthur is somewhat disillusioned about the national standard of life after hearing the story of a mother infected with smallpox, he still ends up getting Hank and himself hunted down by the members of a village after making several extremely erroneous remarks about agriculture. Although they are saved by a nobleman's entourage, the same nobleman later arrests them and sells them into slavery.

Hank steals a piece of metal in London and uses it to create a makeshift lockpick. His plan is to free himself and the king, beat up their slave driver, and return to Camelot. However, before he can free the king, a man enters their quarters in the dark. Mistaking him for the slave driver, Hank rushes after him alone and starts a fight with him. They are both arrested. Hank lies his way out, but in his absence, the real slave driver has discovered Hank's escape. Since Hank was the most valuable slave, he was due to be sold the next day. The man becomes enraged and begins beating his other slaves, who fight back and kill him. All the slaves, including the king, will be hanged as soon as the missing one, Hank, is found. Hank is captured, but he and Arthur are rescued by a party of knights led by Lancelot, riding bicycles. Then, the king becomes extremely bitter against slavery and vows to abolish it when they get free, much to Hank's delight.

Sagramore returns from his quest and fights Hank, who defeats him and seven others, including Galahad and Lancelot, using a lasso. When Merlin steals Hank's lasso, Sagramore returns to challenge him again. This time, Hank kills him with a revolver. He proceeds to challenge the knights of Britain to attack him en masse, which they do. After he kills nine more knights with his revolvers, the rest break and flee. The next day, Hank reveals his 19th-century infrastructure to the country. With that fact, he was called a wizard since he told Clarence to do so as well.

Interdict 
Three years later, Hank has married Sandy, and they have a baby. While asleep and dreaming, Hank says, "Hello-Central", a reference to calling a 19th-century telephone operator, and Sandy believes the mystic phrase to be the name of a former girlfriend or lover and thus to please him names their child accordingly. However, the baby falls critically ill, and Hank's doctors advise him to take his family overseas while the baby recovers. In reality, it is a ploy by the Catholic Church to get Hank out of the country to leave it without effective leadership. During the weeks that Hank is absent, Arthur discovers Guinevere's infidelity with Lancelot. That causes a war between Lancelot and Arthur, who is eventually killed by Sir Mordred.

The church then places the land under interdict, causing all people to break away from Hank and revolt. Hank sees that something is wrong by the lack of trade in the English Channel, and returns to Britain to meet with his good friend Clarence who informs him of the war thus far. As time goes on, Clarence gathers 52 young cadets, aged from 14 to 17, who are to fight against all of Britain. Hank's band fortifies itself in Merlin's Cave with a minefield, electric wire and Gatling guns. The Church sends an army of 30,000 knights to attack them, but they are slaughtered by the cadets wielding Hank's modern weaponry.

However, Hank's men are now trapped in the cave by a wall of dead bodies and sickened by the miasma bred by thousands of corpses. Hank attempts to go offer aid to any wounded, but is stabbed by the first wounded man he tries to help, Sir Meliagraunce. He is not seriously injured but is bedridden. Disease begins to set in. One night, Clarence finds Merlin weaving a spell over Hank, proclaiming that he will sleep for 1,300 years. Merlin begins laughing deliriously but ends up electrocuting himself on one of the electric wires. Clarence and the others all apparently die from disease in the cave.

More than a millennium later, the narrator finishes the manuscript and finds Hank on his deathbed and dreaming about Sandy. He attempts to make one last "effect" but dies before he can finish it.

Genesis, composition and contemporary critical response

Twain's first encounter with the Morte d'Arthur occurred in 1880, when someone in his household bought Sidney Lanier's bowdlerized edition, The Boy's King Arthur. Whether he read this children's version or not isn't known. However he certainly read the unexpurgated work after his close friend George Washington Cable recommended it to him in November 1884. The pair were travelling on the lecture circuit as the "Twins of Genius" during the winter of 1884-1885 when Cable spotted the Morte on the front table of a Rochester, New York bookstore that both were perusing. Cable pointed to the volume and said "you will never lay it down until you have read it cover to cover." Twain bought this copy and read it in nearly one sitting during a train ride to their next lecture date. After the book's great success, Twain was careful to credit Cable for his inspiration, referring to him as "the Godfather of my book."

Soon thereafter, in December 1884, Twain conceived of the idea behind A Connecticut Yankee in King Arthur's Court and worked on its realization between 1885 and 1889. The bulk of its composition was done at Twain's summer home at Elmira, New York and was completed at Hartford, Connecticut. It was first published in England by Chatto & Windus under the title A Yankee at the Court of King Arthur in December 1889. Writer and critic William Dean Howells called it Twain's best work and "an object-lesson in democracy".  The work was met with some indignation in Great Britain, where it was perceived as "a direct attack on [its] hereditary and aristocratic institutions".

Analysis
The book pokes fun at contemporary society, but the main thrust is a satire of romanticized ideas of chivalry, and of the idealization of the Middle Ages common in the novels of Sir Walter Scott and other 19th-century literature. Twain had a particular dislike for Scott, blaming his kind of romanticizing of battle for the southern states' deciding to fight the American Civil War. He writes in Life on the Mississippi:

For example, the book portrays the medieval people as being very gullible, as when Merlin makes a "veil of invisibility" which, according to him, will make the wearer imperceptible to his enemies, though friends can still see him. The knight Sir Sagramor wears it to fight Hank, who pretends that he cannot see Sagramor for effect to the audience.

Hank Morgan's opinions are also strongly denounciatory towards the Catholic Church of the medieval period;  the Church is seen by the Yankee as an oppressive institution that stifles science and teaches peasants meekness only as a means of preventing the overthrow of Church rule and taxation.  The book also contains many depictions and condemnations of the dangers of superstition and the horrors of medieval slavery.

The book provides evidence of Twain's growing interest in Georgist economics and social theory. This is particularly evident in the interpretative illustrations by Georgist activist Daniel Carter Beard. Twain approved and considered them an essential part of the work.

George Orwell strongly disapproved of the book: "[Twain] squandered his time on boffooneries [such as] A Connecticut Yankee in King Arthur's Court, which is a deliberate flattery of all that is worst and most vulgar in American Life" (i.e. the various American inventions and institutions Hank Morgan introduces into sixth-century Britain and whose excellence and superiority are taken for granted).

It is possible to see the book as an important transitional work for Twain, in that earlier, sunnier passages recall the frontier humor of his tall tales such as The Celebrated Jumping Frog of Calaveras County, while the corrosive view of human behavior in the apocalyptic latter chapters is more akin to darker, later Twain works such as The Mysterious Stranger and Letters from the Earth.

George Hardy notes, "The final scenes of 'Connecticut Yankee' depict massed cavalry attempting to storm a position defended by wire and machine guns—and getting massacred, none reaching their objective. Deduct the fantasy anachronism of the assailants being Medieval knights, and you get a chillingly accurate prediction of a typical First World War battle.... The modern soldiers of 1914 with their bayonets had no more chance to win such a fight than Twain's knights".

One frequently overlooked aspect of the book is the emotional intensity felt by Hank towards his family: wife Sandy and baby Hello-Central.  Twain's own son, Langdon, died of diphtheria at the age of 19 months, which was likely reflected in Hello-Central's membranous croup.  Twain also outlived two of his three daughters, but they both died after the completion of "Yankee." The last chapters of the book are full of Hank's pronouncements of love, culminating in his final delirium, where "an abyss of thirteen centuries yawning between me and you!" is worse than death.

As science fiction
While Connecticut Yankee is sometimes credited as the foundational work in the time travel subgenre of science fiction, Twain's novel had several important immediate predecessors. Among them are H. G. Wells's story "The Chronic Argonauts" (1888), which was a precursor to The Time Machine (1895). Also published the year before Connecticut Yankee was Edward Bellamy's wildly popular Looking Backward (1888), in which the protagonist is put into a hypnosis-induced sleep and wakes up in the year 2000. Yet another American novel that could have served as a more direct inspiration to Twain was The Fortunate Island (1882) by Charles Heber Clark. In this novel, a technically proficient American is shipwrecked on an island that broke off from Britain during Arthurian times, and never developed any further.

Twain's book introduced what remains one of the main literary devices used in time travel literature—a modern person is suddenly hurled into the past, by some force completely beyond the traveler's control, is stuck there irrevocably, and must make the best of it—typically, by trying to introduce modern inventions and institutions into the past society. Several works considered classics of science fiction clearly follow on this pattern set by Twain, such as L. Sprague de Camp's Lest Darkness Fall and Poul Anderson's "The Man Who Came Early." This strand of time travel literature is clearly distinct from that following the basic pattern of the Wells works, where the protagonist is in possession of a time machine and is able to travel at will back and forth in time. The literary device continues to see use throughout modern science fiction, from popular American time travel stories such as Michael Crichton's Timeline to Japanese Isekai like Handyman Saitō in Another World.

Adaptations and references
Since the beginning of the 20th century, this famous story has been adapted many times for the stage, feature-length motion pictures, and animated cartoons. The earliest film version was Fox's 1921 silent version. In 1927, the novel was adapted into the musical A Connecticut Yankee by Richard Rodgers and Lorenz Hart. A 1931 film, also called A Connecticut Yankee, starred Will Rogers. The story was adapted as an hour-long radio play on the October 5, 1947, broadcast of the Ford Theatre, starring Karl Swenson. A 1949 musical film featured Bing Crosby and Rhonda Fleming, with music by Jimmy Van Heusen and Victor Young. In 1960, Tennessee Ernie Ford starred in a television adaptation. In 1970, the book was adapted into a 74-minute animated TV special directed by Zoran Janjic with Orson Bean as the voice of the title character. In 1978 an episode of Once Upon a Classic, "A Connecticut Yankee in King Arthur's Court", was an adaptation, which starred Paul Rudd and Tovah Feldshuh, with Richard Basehart as Arthur and Roscoe Lee Browne as Merlin. This episode was released as though a feature on VHS and laserdisc by MasterVision in 1987 with the cover title, Mark Twain's A Connecticut Yankee..., and later as a double feature DVD with The Amazing Mr. Blunden. The DVD version, released by budget label East West DVD at a suggested retail price of $1, lacks the series intro and Bill Bixby's introduction. Also in 1979 was the Disney film Unidentified Flying Oddball, also known as A Spaceman in King Arthur's Court. The TV series The Transformers had a second-season episode, "A Decepticon Raider in King Arthur's Court", that had a group of Autobots and Decepticons sent back to the Middle Ages. In 1988, the Soviet variation called New Adventures of a Yankee in King Arthur's Court appeared. More recently it was adapted into a 1989 television film by Paul Zindel which starred Keshia Knight Pulliam and René Auberjonois. In 1987, Disney even paid homage to the story in a first-season episode of DuckTales ("Sir Gyro de Gearloose"), in which Gyro builds a time machine and flees the modern age for the time of King Arthur, taking Huey, Dewey and Louie along for the adventure.

It has also inspired many variations and parodies, such as the 1979 Bugs Bunny special A Connecticut Rabbit in King Arthur's Court. A Knight for a Day is a 1946 Disney short film starring Goofy that is loosely inspired by the novel. In 1995, Walt Disney Studios adapted the book into the feature film A Kid in King Arthur's Court. A 1992 cartoon series, King Arthur & the Knights of Justice, could also be seen as deriving inspiration from the novel. Terry Pratchett's 1995 short story "Once and Future" tells a similar story of a time-traveller, Mervin, stranded in a pre-Arthurian "Avalon", who refers to himself as being like "the Connecticut Yankee". In 1998 Disney made another adaption with Whoopi Goldberg in A Knight in Camelot.

Several independent films produced during the 1990s drew inspiration from the novel, such as Army of Darkness (1992) and the fourth and fifth entries in the Trancers series. The 2001 film Black Knight similarly transports a modern-day American to Medieval England while adding racial element to the time-traveler plotline.

In the Carl Sagan novel Contact, the protagonist, Eleanor Arroway, is reading A Connecticut Yankee in King Arthur's Court, specifically the scene where Hank first approaches Camelot, when she finds out about her father's death. The quotation Bridgeport?' Said I. 'Camelot,' Said he" is also used later in the book, and the story is used as a metaphor for contact between civilizations at very different levels of technological and ethical advancement.

Yankee has also greatly influenced the premier Soviet sci-fi writers, Strugatsky Brothers, and their two seminal books.  In humorous Monday Begins on Saturday Merlin's character is taken entirely from the Mark Twain's book, and he often references it.  Hard to Be a God is essentially a remake of Yankee, concentrating on the moral and ethical questions of "civilizing the uncivilized."  Its ending is almost identical to Yankee:  both main protagonists crumble under the weight of dead bodies of those they tried to civilize.

The fifth season of TV series Once Upon a Time features Hank Morgan.  He is introduced in the episode "Dreamcatcher" as Sir Morgan, a widower with a teenaged daughter, Violet, living in a Camelot that exists in a magical reality.  Violet becomes a love interest for main character Henry Mills.  Morgan does not appear on screen again, but is mentioned in later episodes.  He and Violet, along with other Camelot residents, are transported to Storybrooke in the "real" world.  When most of Arthur's court returns to Camelot, Violet informs Henry that she and her father will stay in Storybrooke, as her father is originally from Connecticut in the same world.  A tie-in novel, Henry and Violet, confirms other details consistent with Twain's novel, such as Hank leaving Connecticut in the year 1889.

In the Chronicles of the Imaginarium Geographica series by James A. Owen, Hank appears in several books as a time-travelling "Messenger" recruited by Mark Twain. Hank is able to travel through time and space at will using an enchanted pocketwatch, which eventually suffers a malfunction that strands him in the time stream. (Sandy and Hello-Central are not mentioned in the series.)

The television series MacGyver includes a two-part adaptation ("Good Knight MacGyver", season 7, episodes 7 & 8, 1991) in which a modern-day engineer is transported to Arthur's court, where he uses his "magic" (science) to assist Merlin and save the king from a deadly plot. After over six seasons on the air, the second part is the only episode to ever reveal MacGyver's first name.

See also

 1889 in science fiction
 Black Knight
 A Dream of John Ball (1889) by William Morris
 List of films based on Arthurian legend
 Mark Twain bibliography
 Solar eclipses in fiction

General and cited references

Citations

External links

 
 
 
 SparkNotes on the book

1889 American novels
1889 fantasy novels
1889 science fiction novels
American alternate history novels
American fantasy novels adapted into films
American novels adapted into television shows
American science fiction novels
Modern Arthurian fiction
Novels about time travel
Novels by Mark Twain
Novels set in Connecticut
Novels set in the 6th century
Portal fantasy